is a Japanese professional footballer who plays as a forward for  club Avispa Fukuoka.

Career statistics

Club
.

Notes

References

External links
Profile at Avispa Fukuoka

1999 births
Living people
Meiji University alumni
Japanese footballers
Association football forwards
Tokyo Verdy players
Avispa Fukuoka players
J1 League players
J2 League players